Grand Prix de la Ville de Lillers is a road bicycle race held annually near Lillers, a commune in the Nord-Pas-de-Calais region of France. The editions 1964-1995 were reserved to amateurs. Since 2005, it is rated 1.2 on the UCI Europe Tour. The race was not held in 2015 because of financial difficulties.

Winners

Reference

External links
 2008 GP Lillers
  http://www.cyclingarchives.com/wedstrijdfiche.php?wedstrijdid=224

Cycle races in France
UCI Europe Tour races
Recurring sporting events established in 1964
1964 establishments in France
Sport in Pas-de-Calais